The Possession of Joel Delaney is a 1970 horror novel by American writer Ramona Stewart. Its plot follows a woman who comes to believe her brother has been possessed by the spirit of a serial killer. It was adapted into the 1972 feature film of the same title starring Shirley MacLaine and Perry King.

References

External links
The Possession of Joel Delaney at Goodreads

1970 novels
American horror novels
Novels set in New York City